Minuscule 668 (in the Gregory-Aland numbering), ε 1205 (von Soden), is a Greek minuscule manuscript of the New Testament, on parchment. Palaeographically it has been assigned to the 13th or 14th century. The manuscript has complex contents. Scrivener labelled it by 1144e.

Description

The codex contains the entire of the four Gospels, on 201 parchment leaves (size ). The text is written in one column per page, 25-28 lines per page.

The heading for the Gospel of Mark is titled εκ του κατά Μάρκου.

The Ammonian Sections are given (in Mark 234 Sections - last numbered section in 16:9), with references to the Eusebian Canons.

It contains lectionary markings at the margin (for liturgical use), Synaxarion, Menologion, and pictures.

Text
The Greek text of the codex is a representative of the Byzantine text-type. Kurt Aland placed it in Category V.

According to C. R. Gregory it has good readings.

According to the Claremont Profile Method it belongs to the textual family Kx in Luke 1; 10; 20.

History
Gregory dated it to the 12th century. Currently the manuscript is dated by the INTF to the 13th or 14th century.

The manuscript was bought by Albert L. Long in Constantinople (see Minuscule 667).

Gregory saw the manuscript in 1885 in Paris. The manuscript was collated by H. H. Severn in 1928 in his unpublished Ph.D. thesis.

Currently the manuscript is housed at the Syracuse University (Ms. 226.048G), in Syracuse, New York.

See also

 List of New Testament minuscules
 Biblical manuscript
 Textual criticism

Notes

References

Further reading
 I. H. Hall, On a Cursive Ms. of the Greek Gospels, Proceedings of the American Oriental Society (New Haven, 1884), pp. III-IV; and (1885), pp. CCV-CCVI.
 K. W. Clark, A Descriptive Catalogue of Greek New Testament Manuscripts in America (Chicago, 1937), pp. 216–217

Greek New Testament minuscules
13th-century biblical manuscripts